Pokrzywnik may refer to the following places in Poland:
Pokrzywnik, Lwówek Śląski County in Lower Silesian Voivodeship (south-west Poland)
Pokrzywnik, Zgorzelec County in Lower Silesian Voivodeship (south-west Poland)
Pokrzywnik, Kuyavian-Pomeranian Voivodeship (north-central Poland)
Pokrzywnik, Masovian Voivodeship (east-central Poland)